The 2021–22 Swiss Handball League (known as the Quickline Handball League for sponsorship reasons) was the 73rd season of the Handball League, Swiss premier handball league. It ram from 2 September 2021 to 7 June 2022.

Kadetten Schaffhausen won their twelfth title.

Teams

Arenas and locations
The following 14 clubs competed in the Slovenian First League during the 2021–22 season:

Regular season

League table

Playoffs
All three rounds of the playoffs were played in a best-of-five format, with the higher seeded team playing the first, third and fifth (if it was necessary) game at home.

Quarterfinals

|}

Semifinals

|}

Finals

|}

Game 1

Game 2

Game 3

Kadetten Schaffhausen won the Finals, 3–0 on series.

Playout
The playout were played in a best-of-five format, with the higher seeded team playing the first, third and fifth (if it was necessary) game at home.

|}
RTV 1879 Basel won 3–0 on series and retained their Swiss Handball League spot, Chênois Genève was relegated to the Nationalliga B.

Final standings

See also
 2021–22 Swiss Cup

References

External links
Swiss Handball Association 

Handball leagues in Switzerland
Switzerland
Handball
Handball